Hennepin County Government Center is the courthouse and primary county government administration building for Hennepin County in the U.S. state of Minnesota. It is located in downtown Minneapolis, the county seat of Hennepin County. Before its construction, the Hennepin County government offices were housed in the Minneapolis City Hall-Hennepin County Courthouse. The building was opened in 1974 and occupied in stages in 1975.

Building
The building was designed by the architectural firm of John Carl Warnecke & Associates. It was dedicated in 1973 and completed in 1977. When viewed from the northeast or southwest sides, it takes on the appearance of a stylized letter H. This shape serves as the logo of Hennepin County. Each side of the "H" is a separate tower. The towers are connected by catwalk bridges on several floors. The whole is enclosed by glass windows to form an atrium. In early 2015 remodeling was done on the skyway-level public area, which now features new seating, high-top tables with electrical outlets, lighting and flat screen TVs.

The southeast side is known as the court tower. It houses courtrooms, county attorney offices, and the Hennepin County Law Library. The northwest side houses county administrative offices such as social services and county records.

Location
The Hennepin County Government Center is built over 6th Street using the air rights over the street, which enabled two large plazas to be built in the city blocks.

It is connected by a tunnel to the Minneapolis City Hall, underneath 5th Street and the METRO Blue and Green lines. The Government Plaza METRO station is between the two buildings. The tunnel also connects to the federal courthouse for the United States District Court for the District of Minnesota.

The building has a skyway link to the US Bank Plaza Building (formerly Pillsbury Center). The link to the Thrivent (formerly Lutheran Brotherhood) headquarters building was closed in June 2018 due to demolition of an adjacent parking ramp and planned construction of a new Minneapolis public service center.

There is a separate secure tunnel to the Hennepin County Public Safety Facility (jail) located diagonally across the plaza.

History
Before its construction, the Hennepin County government offices were housed in the Minneapolis City Hall-Hennepin County Courthouse.

After earlier suicides by jumping from the catwalk bridges,  glass wall panels were added to the bridges & balconies throughout the building. One additional suicide occurred after this, when a person pulled seating benches onto a catwalk, climbed on top of them, and jumped over the glass walls.

Following a deadly shooting within the court tower in 2003, new security measures were implemented. New metal detectors were installed, along with X-ray equipment. The 2nd-floor lobby service desks at the skyway level were re-configured to accommodate the changes.

The building was the site of a performance by French tight-rope walker Philippe Petit.

In 2021, the building was the venue for the criminal trial of Derek Chauvin, the Minneapolis police officer who murdered George Floyd during an arrest incident a year earlier.

See also
List of tallest buildings in Minneapolis

References

External links
Hennepin County web site

County courthouses in Minnesota
Buildings and structures in Hennepin County, Minnesota
Buildings and structures in Minneapolis
Government buildings completed in 1977
Skyscraper office buildings in Minneapolis